The Faroe Islands 358 species of bird have been recorded. There are about 40 common breeding birds, including the seabirds fulmar (600,000 pairs), puffin (550,000 pairs), storm petrel (250,000 pairs), black-legged kittiwake (230,000 pairs), guillemot (175,000 pairs), Manx shearwater (25,000 pairs).

This list's taxonomic treatment (designation and sequence of orders, families and species) and nomenclature (common and scientific names) follow the conventions of The Clements Checklist of Birds of the World, 2022 edition. The family accounts at the beginning of each heading reflect this taxonomy, as do the species counts found in each family account. Accidental species are included in the total species count for the Faroe Islands.

Symbolically, the most important of the birds of the Faroe Islands is the Eurasian oystercatcher (Haematopus ostralegus). Their annual arrival on about 12 March is celebrated by the Faroe Islanders as the start of spring. For this reason, the tjaldur (pronounced ), is recognised as the national bird of the Faroes. However, in numbers, the avifauna is dominated by an estimated two million pairs of breeding seabirds of several species.  There are also some resident landbirds and many regular visitors, both passage migrants and breeders, as well as several species recorded occasionally as vagrants, mainly from Europe.  The Faroese postal system, the Postverk Føroya, prints stamps portraying Faroe birds. See external links.

History
In the 19th century, the islands were occasionally visited by black-browed albatross; one bird regularly summering with gannets for 34 years before it was killed for the Natural History Museum in Copenhagen. The great auk also visited the Faroes and may have bred there, but became extinct throughout its range in the North Atlantic in the early 19th century due to human predation. The pied raven, a colour morph of the common raven, also occurred but all had been killed by the middle of the 20th century.

Historically, harvesting seabirds for food was an important source of nutrition for the islanders. A reduced and strictly regulated harvest, mainly of fulmars and puffins, continues. In general, the seabirds and their nesting areas are now strongly protected.

The following tags highlight several categories of occurrence other than regular migrants and residents.

 (A) Accidental - a species that rarely or accidentally occurs in the Faroe Islands
 (I) Introduced - a species introduced to the Faroe Islands as a consequence, direct or indirect, of human actions

Ducks, geese, and waterfowl
Order: AnseriformesFamily: Anatidae

Anatidae includes the ducks and most duck-like waterfowl, such as geese and swans. These birds are adapted to an aquatic existence with webbed feet, flattened bills, and feathers that are excellent at shedding water due to an oily coating.

 Bar-headed goose, Anser indicus (A)
 Snow goose, Anser caerulescens (A)
 Graylag goose (grágás), Anser anser
 Greater white-fronted goose (korngás), Anser albifrons
 Taiga bean-goose, Anser fabalis (A)
 Tundra bean-goose, Anser serrirostris (A)
 Pink-footed goose (íslandsgás), Anser brachyrhynchus
 Brant (helsigás), Branta bernicla
 Barnacle goose (øshvít gás), Branta leucopsis
 Cackling goose, Branta hutchinsii (A)
 Canada goose, Branta canadensis (I)
 Mute swan (knubbsvanur), Cygnus olor (I)
 Tundra swan, Cygnus columbianus (A)
 Whooper swan (svanur, okn), Cygnus cygnus
 Common shelduck, Tadorna tadorna (A)
 Wood duck, Aix sponsa (A)
 Mandarin duck, Aix galericulata (A)
 Garganey, Spatula querquedula (A)
 Blue-winged teal, Spatula discors (A)
 Northern shoveler, Spatula clypeata (A)
 Gadwall, Mareca strepera (A)
 Eurasian wigeon (ennigul ont), Mareca penelope 
 American wigeon, Mareca americana (A)
 Mallard (villdunna), Anas platyrhynchos
 American black duck, Anas rubripes (A)
 Northern pintail (stikkont), Anas acuta
 Green-winged teal (krikkont), Anas crecca
 Common pochard, Aythya ferina (A)
 Ring-necked duck, Aythya collaris (A)
 Ferruginous duck, Aythya nyroca (A)
 Tufted duck (trøllont), Aythya fuligula 
 Greater scaup, Aythya marila (A)
 Lesser scaup, Aythya affinis (A)
 Steller's eider, Polysticta stelleri (A)
 King eider (æðukongur), Somateria spectabilis (A)
 Common eider (æða), Somateria mollissima  
 Harlequin duck, Histrionicus histrionicus (A)
 Surf scoter, Melanitta perspicillata (A)
 Velvet scoter, Melanitta fusca (A)
 White-winged scoter, Melanitta deglandi (A)
 Common scoter (kolont), Melanitta nigra 
 Long-tailed duck (ógvella), Clangula hyemalis 
 Common goldeneye (súgont), Bucephala clangula 
 Barrow's goldeneye (íslendsk súgont), Bucephala islandica (A)
 Smew, Mergellus albellus (A)
 Hooded merganser, Lophodytes cucullatus (A)
 Common merganser (tannont), Mergus merganser (A)
 Red-breasted merganser (toppont), Mergus serrator

Pheasants, grouse, and allies
Order: GalliformesFamily: Phasianidae

These are terrestrial species of gamebirds, feeding and nesting on the ground. They are variable in size but generally plump, with broad and relatively short wings. 

 Willow ptarmigan, Lagopus lagopus (I)
 Rock ptarmigan, Lagopus muta (I)
 Black grouse, Lyrurus tetrix
 Common quail (vaktil), Coturnix coturnix (A)

Grebes
Order: PodicipediformesFamily: Podicipedidae

Grebes are small to medium-large freshwater diving birds. They have lobed toes and are excellent swimmers and divers. However, they have their feet placed far back on the body, making them quite ungainly on land.

 Little grebe (smágjør), Tachybaptus ruficollis (A)
 Pied-billed grebe, Podilymbus podiceps (A)
 Horned grebe (gjør), Podiceps auritus
 Red-necked grebe, Podiceps grisegena (A)
 Great crested grebe, Podiceps cristatus (A)

Pigeons and doves
Order: ColumbiformesFamily: Columbidae

Pigeons and doves are stout-bodied birds with short necks and short slender bills with a fleshy cere.

 Rock pigeon (bládúgva), Columba livia
 Stock dove (bládúgva), Columba oenas (A)
 Common wood-pigeon, Columba palumbus
 European turtle-dove, Streptopelia turtur
 Oriental turtle-dove, Streptopelia orientalis (A)
 Eurasian collared-dove, Streptopelia decaocto (A)
 Mourning dove, Zenaida macroura (A)

Sandgrouse
Order: PterocliformesFamily: Pteroclidae

Sandgrouse have small pigeon-like heads and necks, but sturdy compact bodies. They have long pointed wings and sometimes tails and a fast direct flight. Flocks fly to watering holes at dawn and dusk. Their legs are feathered down to the toes. 

 Pallas's sandgrouse, Syrrhaptes paradoxus (A)

Cuckoos
Order: CuculiformesFamily: Cuculidae

The family Cuculidae includes cuckoos, roadrunners, and anis. These birds are of variable size with slender bodies, long tails, and strong legs. The Old World cuckoos are brood parasites.

 Common cuckoo, Cuculus canorus (A)

Nightjars and allies
Order: CaprimulgiformesFamily: Caprimulgidae

Nightjars are medium-sized nocturnal birds that usually nest on the ground. They have long wings, short legs, and very short bills. Most have small feet, of little use for walking, and long pointed wings. Their soft plumage is camouflaged to resemble bark or leaves.

 Common nighthawk, Chordeiles minor (A)
 Eurasian nightjar, Caprimulgus europaeus (A)

Swifts
Order: CaprimulgiformesFamily: Apodidae

Swifts are small birds which spend the majority of their lives flying. These birds have very short legs and never settle voluntarily on the ground, perching instead only on vertical surfaces. Many swifts have long swept-back wings which resemble a crescent or boomerang.

 White-throated needletail, Hirundapus caudacutus (A)
 Alpine swift, Apus melba (A)
 Common swift, Apus apus

Rails, gallinules, and coots
Order: GruiformesFamily: Rallidae

Rallidae is a large family of small to medium-sized birds which includes the rails, crakes, coots, and gallinules. Typically they inhabit dense vegetation in damp environments near lakes, swamps, or rivers. In general they are shy and secretive birds, making them difficult to observe. Most species have strong legs and long toes which are well adapted to soft uneven surfaces. They tend to have short, rounded wings and to be weak fliers.

 Water rail (jarðakona), Rallus aquaticus
 Corn crake (akurskrift), Crex crex (A)
 Spotted crake, Porzana porzana (A)
 Eurasian moorhen, Gallinula chloropus
 Eurasian coot, Fulica atra
 American coot, Fulica americana (A)
 Baillon's crake, Zapornia pusilla (A)

Cranes
Order: GruiformesFamily: Gruidae

Cranes are large, long-legged, and long-necked birds. Unlike the similar-looking but unrelated herons, cranes fly with necks outstretched, not pulled back. Most have elaborate and noisy courting displays or "dances".

 Sandhill crane, Antigone canadensis (A)
 Common crane, Grus grus (A)

Thick-knees
Order: CharadriiformesFamily: Burhinidae

The thick-knees are a group of waders found worldwide within the tropical zone, with some species also breeding in temperate Europe and Australia. They are medium to large waders with strong black or yellow-black bills, large yellow eyes, and cryptic plumage. Despite being classed as waders, most species have a preference for arid or semi-arid habitats.

 Eurasian thick-knee, Burhinus oedicnemus (A)

Stilts and avocets
Order: CharadriiformesFamily: Recurvirostridae

Recurvirostridae is a family of large wading birds which includes the avocets and stilts. The avocets have long legs and long up-curved bills. The stilts have extremely long legs and long, thin, straight bills.

 Pied avocet, Recurvirostra avosetta (A)

Oystercatchers
Order: CharadriiformesFamily: Haematopodidae

The oystercatchers are large and noisy plover-like birds, with strong bills used for smashing or prising open molluscs.

 Eurasian oystercatcher (tjaldur), Haematopus ostralegus

Plovers and lapwings
Order: CharadriiformesFamily: Charadriidae

The family Charadriidae includes the plovers, dotterels, and lapwings. They are small to medium-sized birds with compact bodies, short thick necks, and long, usually pointed, wings. They are found in open country worldwide, mostly in habitats near water.

 Black-bellied plover, Pluvialis squatarola (A)
 European golden-plover (lógv), Pluvialis apricaria
 Northern lapwing (vípa), Vanellus vanellus
 Common ringed plover (svarthálsa), Charadrius hiaticula
 Semipalmated plover, Charadrius semipalmatus (A)
 Little ringed plover, Charadrius dubius (A)
 Killdeer, Charadrius vociferus (A)
 Eurasian dotterel, Charadrius morinellus (A)

Sandpipers and allies

Order: CharadriiformesFamily: Scolopacidae

Scolopacidae is a large diverse family of small to medium-sized shorebirds including the sandpipers, curlews, godwits, shanks, tattlers, woodcocks, snipes, dowitchers, and phalaropes. The majority of these species eat small invertebrates picked out of the mud or soil. Variation in length of legs and bills enables multiple species to feed in the same habitat, particularly on the coast, without direct competition for food.

 Whimbrel (spógvi), Numenius phaeopus
 Eurasian curlew, Numenius arquata
 Bar-tailed godwit, Limosa lapponica
 Black-tailed godwit (reyðspógvi), Limosa limosa
 Ruddy turnstone, Arenaria interpres
 Red knot, Calidris canutus
 Ruff, Calidris pugnax
 Broad-billed sandpiper, Calidris falcinellus (A)
 Curlew sandpiper, Calidris ferruginea (A)
 Temminck's stint, Calidris temminckii (A)
 Sanderling, Calidris alba
 Dunlin (fjallmurra), Calidris alpina
 Purple sandpiper (sjógrælingur), Calidris maritima
 Baird's sandpiper, Calidris bairdii (A)
 Little stint, Calidris minuta (A)
 White-rumped sandpiper, Calidris fuscicollis (A)
 Buff-breasted sandpiper, Calidris subruficollis (A)
 Pectoral sandpiper, Calidris melanotos (A)
 Semipalmated sandpiper, Calidris pusilla (A)
 Long-billed dowitcher, Limnodromus scolopaceus (A)
 Jack snipe, Lymnocryptes minimus
 Eurasian woodcock, Scolopax rusticola
 Common snipe (mýrisnípa), Gallinago gallinago 
 Wilson's snipe, Gallinago delicata (A)
 Red-necked phalarope (hálsareyði), Phalaropus lobatus
 Red phalarope, Phalaropus fulicarius
 Common sandpiper, Actitis hypoleucos (A)
 Green sandpiper, Tringa ochropus (A)
 Spotted redshank, Tringa erythropus (A)
 Greater yellowlegs, Tringa melanoleuca (A)
 Common greenshank, Tringa nebularia (A)
 Wood sandpiper, Tringa glareola (A)
 Common redshank (stelkur), Tringa totanus

Skuas and jaegers
Order: CharadriiformesFamily: Stercorariidae

The family Stercorariidae are, in general, medium to large sea birds, typically with gray or brown plumage, often with white markings on the wings. They nest on the ground in temperate and arctic regions and are long-distance migrants.

 Great skua (skúgvur), Stercorarius skua
 South Polar skua, Stercorarius maccormicki (A)
 Pomarine jaeger (jói), Stercorarius pomarinus
 Parasitic jaeger (kjógvi), Stercorarius parasiticus
 Long-tailed jaeger (snældukjógvi), Stercorarius longicaudus

Auks, murres, and puffins

Alcidae are a family of seabirds which are superficially similar to penguins with their black-and-white colors, their upright posture, and some of their habits, but which are able to fly.

 Dovekie (fulkubbi), Alle alle
 Common murre (lomvigi/a), Uria aalge
 Thick-billed murre (íslandslomvigi/a), Uria lomvia
 Razorbill (álka), Alca torda 
 Great auk (gorfuglur), Pinguinus impennis - extinct
 Black guillemot (teisti), Cepphus grylle
 Atlantic puffin (lundi), Fratercula arctica
 Tufted puffin, Fratercula cirrhata (A)

Gulls, terns, and skimmers

Order: CharadriiformesFamily: Laridae

Laridae is a family of medium to large seabirds and includes gulls, terns, and skimmers. Gulls are typically gray or white, often with black markings on the head or wings. They have stout, longish, bills and webbed feet. Terns are a group of generally medium to large seabirds typically with gray or white plumage, often with black markings on the head. Most terns hunt fish by diving but some pick insects off the surface of fresh water. Terns are generally long-lived birds, with several species known to live in excess of 30 years.

 Black-legged kittiwake (rita), Rissa tridactyla
 Ivory gull, Pagophila eburnea (A)
 Sabine's gull, Xema sabini (A)
 Bonaparte's gull, Chroicocephalus philadelphia (A)
 Black-headed gull (fransaterna), Chroicocephalus ridibundus
 Little gull, Hydrocoloeus minutus (A)
 Ross's gull, Rhodostethia rosea (A)
 Franklin's gull, Leucophaeus pipixcan (A)
 Mediterranean gull, Ichthyaetus melanocephalus (A)
 Common gull (skatumási, skata, gneggjus), Larus canus
 Short-billed gull, Larus brachyrhynchus (A)
 Ring-billed gull, Larus delawarensis (A)
 Herring gull (fiskimási), Larus argentatus
 Iceland gull (lítil valmási), Larus glaucoides
 Lesser black-backed gull (likka), Larus fuscus
 Glaucous gull (valmási), Larus hyperboreus
 Great black-backed gull (svartbakur), Larus marinus
 Little tern, Sternula albifrons (A)
 Caspian tern, Hydroprogne caspia (A)
 Black tern, Chlidonias niger (A)
 White-winged tern, Chlidonias leucopterus (A)
 Common tern, Sterna hirundo (A)
 Arctic tern (terna), Sterna paradisaea
 Sandwich tern, Thalasseus sandvicensis (A)

Loons
Order: GaviiformesFamily: Gaviidae

Loons are a group of aquatic birds found in many parts of North America and Northern Europe. They are the size of a large duck or small goose, which they somewhat resemble in shape when swimming, but to which they are completely unrelated. In particular, loons' legs are set very far back which assists swimming underwater but makes walking on land extremely difficult.

 Red-throated loon (lómur), Gavia stellata
 Arctic loon (øssvartur lómur), Gavia arctica (A)
 Pacific loon, Gavia pacifica (A)
 Common loon (havgás), Gavia immer
 Yellow-billed loon (nevgulur lómur), Gavia adamsii (A)

Albatrosses
Order: ProcellariiformesFamily: Diomedeidae

The albatrosses are among the largest of flying birds, and the great albatrosses of the genus Diomedea have the largest wingspans of any extant birds.

 Yellow-nosed albatross, Thalassarche chlororhynchos (A)
 Black-browed albatross (súlukongur), Thalassarche melanophris (A)

Southern storm-petrels
Order: ProcellariiformesFamily: Oceanitidae

The southern storm-petrels are relatives of the petrels and are the smallest seabirds. They feed on planktonic crustaceans and small fish picked from the surface, typically while hovering.

 Wilson's storm-petrel, Oceanites oceanicus (A)

Northern storm-petrels

Order: ProcellariiformesFamily: Hydrobatidae

Though the members of this family are similar in many respects to the southern storm-petrels, including their general appearance and habits, there are enough genetic differences to warrant their placement in a separate family. 

 European storm-petrel (drunnhvíti), Hydrobates pelagicus
 Leach's storm-petrel (sýldur drunnhvíti, havtyrðil), Hydrobates leucorhous

Shearwaters and petrels
Order: ProcellariiformesFamily: Procellariidae

The procellariids are the main group of medium-sized "true petrels", characterized by united nostrils with medium septum and a long outer functional primary.

 Northern fulmar (havhestur), Fulmarus glacialis
 Fea's petrel, Pterodroma feae (A)
 Cory's shearwater, Calonectris borealis (A)
 Great shearwater, Ardenna gravis
 Sooty shearwater, Ardenna griseus (A)
 Manx shearwater (skrápur), Puffinus puffinus

Boobies and gannets

Order: SuliformesFamily: Sulidae

The sulids comprise the gannets and boobies. Both groups are medium-large coastal seabirds that plunge-dive for fish.

 Northern gannet (súla), Morus bassanus

Cormorants and shags
Order: SuliformesFamily: Phalacrocoracidae

Cormorants and shags are medium-to-large aquatic birds, usually with mainly dark plumage and areas of colored skin on the face. The bill is long, thin and sharply hooked. Their feet are four-toed and webbed.

 Great cormorant (hiplingur), Phalacrocorax carbo
 European shag (skarvur), Gulosus aristotelis

Herons, egrets, and bitterns
Order: PelecaniformesFamily: Ardeidae

The family Ardeidae contains the herons, egrets, and bitterns. Herons and egrets are medium to large wading birds with long necks and legs. Bitterns tend to be shorter necked and more secretive. Members of Ardeidae fly with their necks retracted, unlike other long-necked birds such as storks, ibises and spoonbills.

 American bittern, Botaurus lentiginosus (A)
 Great bittern, Botaurus stellaris (A)
 Little bittern, Ixobrychus minutus (A)
 Gray heron (hegri), Ardea cinerea
 Purple heron, Ardea purpurea (A)
 Great egret, Ardea alba (A)
 Little egret, Egretta garzetta (A)
 Cattle egret, Bubulcus ibis (A)
 Black-crowned night-heron, Nycticorax nycticorax (A)

Ibises and spoonbills
Order: PelecaniformesFamily: Threskiornithidae

The family Threskiornithidae includes the ibises and spoonbills. They have long, broad wings. Their bodies tend to be elongated, the neck more so, with rather long legs. The bill is also long, decurved in the case of the ibises, straight and distinctively flattened in the spoonbills.

 Glossy ibis, Plegadis falcinellus (A)
 Eurasian  spoonbill, Platalea leucorodia (A)

Osprey
Order: AccipitriformesFamily: Pandionidae

Pandionidae is a family of fish-eating birds of prey, possessing a very large, powerful hooked beak for tearing flesh from their prey, strong legs, powerful talons, and keen eyesight. The family is monotypic.

 Osprey (fiskiørn), Pandion haliaetus (A)

Hawks, eagles and kites
Order: AccipitriformesFamily: Accipitridae

Accipitridae is a family of birds of prey and includes hawks, eagles, kites, harriers, and Old World vultures. These birds have very large powerful hooked beaks for tearing flesh from their prey, strong legs, powerful talons, and keen eyesight.

 European honey-buzzard, Pernis apivorus (A)
 Eurasian marsh-harrier, Circus aeruginosus (A)
 Hen harrier, Circus cyaneus (A)
 Northern harrier, Circus hudsonius (A)
 Eurasian sparrowhawk, Accipiter nisus (A)
 Northern goshawk, Accipiter gentilis (A)
 Red kite, Milvus milvus (A)
 Black kite, Milvus migrans (A)
 White-tailed eagle, Haliaeetus albicilla (A)
 Rough-legged hawk, Buteo lagopus (A)
 Common buzzard, Buteo buteo (A)

Owls
Order: StrigiformesFamily: Strigidae

Typical owls are small to large solitary nocturnal birds of prey. They have large forward-facing eyes and ears, a hawk-like beak, and a conspicuous circle of feathers around each eye called a facial disk.

 Eurasian scops-owl, Otus scops (A)
 Snowy owl, Bubo scandiacus (A)
 Northern hawk owl, Surnia ulula (A)
 Long-eared owl, Asio otus (A)
 Short-eared owl, Asio flammeus

Hoopoes
Order: BucerotiformesFamily: Upupidae

Hoopoes have black, white and orangey-pink coloring with a large erectile crest on their head.

 Eurasian hoopoe, Upupa epops (A)

Bee-eaters
Order: CoraciiformesFamily: Meropidae

The bee-eaters are a group of near passerine birds in the family Meropidae. Most species are found in Africa but others occur in southern Europe, Madagascar, Australia and New Guinea. They are characterized by richly colored plumage, slender bodies and usually elongated central tail feathers. All are colourful and have long downturned bills and pointed wings, which give them a swallow-like appearance when seen from afar.

 Blue-cheeked bee-eater, Merops persicus (A)
 European bee-eater, Merops apiaster (A)

Rollers
Order: CoraciiformesFamily: Coraciidae

Rollers resemble crows in size and build, but are more closely related to the kingfishers and bee-eaters. They share the colourful appearance of those groups with blues and browns predominating. The two inner front toes are connected, but the outer toe is not.

 European roller, Coracias garrulus (A)

Woodpeckers
Order: PiciformesFamily: Picidae

Woodpeckers are small to medium-sized birds with chisel-like beaks, short legs, stiff tails and long tongues used for capturing insects. Some species have feet with two toes pointing forward and two backward, while several species have only three toes. Many woodpeckers have the habit of tapping noisily on tree trunks with their beaks.

 Eurasian wryneck, Jynx torquilla
 Great spotted woodpecker, Dendrocopos major

Falcons and caracaras

Order: FalconiformesFamily: Falconidae

Falconidae is a family of diurnal birds of prey. They differ from hawks, eagles and kites in that they kill with their beaks instead of their talons.

 Lesser kestrel, Falco naumanni (A)
 Eurasian kestrel, Falco tinnunculus
 Amur falcon, Falco amurensis (A)
 Merlin (smyril), Falco columbarius
 Eurasian hobby, Falco subbuteo (A)
 Gyrfalcon, Falco rusticolus
 Peregrine falcon, Falco peregrinus (A)

Old World orioles
Order: PasseriformesFamily: Oriolidae

The Old World orioles are colourful passerine birds. They are not related to the New World orioles.

 Eurasian golden oriole, Oriolus oriolus (A)

Shrikes
Order: PasseriformesFamily: Laniidae

Shrikes are passerine birds known for their habit of catching other birds and small animals and impaling the uneaten portions of their bodies on thorns. A shrike's beak is hooked, like that of a typical bird of prey. 

 Red-backed shrike, Lanius collurio (A)
 Isabelline shrike, Lanius isabellinus (A)
 Great gray shrike, Lanius excubitor (A)
 Lesser gray shrike, Lanius minor (A)

Crows, jays, and magpies

Order: PasseriformesFamily: Corvidae

The family Corvidae includes crows, ravens, jays, choughs, magpies, treepies, nutcrackers, and ground jays. Corvids are above average in size among the Passeriformes, and some of the larger species show high levels of intelligence.

 Eurasian magpie, Pica pica (A)
 Eurasian jackdaw, Corvus monedula
 Rook, Corvus frugilegus
 Carrion crow, Corvus corone
 Hooded crow (kráka), Corvus cornix	
 Common raven (ravnur), Corvus corax

Tits, chickadees, and titmice
Order: PasseriformesFamily: Paridae

The Paridae are mainly small stocky woodland species with short stout bills. Some have crests. They are adaptable birds, with a mixed diet including seeds and insects.

 Eurasian blue tit, Cyanistes caeruleus (A)
 Great tit, Parus major (A)

Larks
Order: PasseriformesFamily: Alaudidae

Larks are small terrestrial birds with often extravagant songs and display flights. Most larks are fairly dull in appearance. Their food is insects and seeds.

 Horned lark, Eremophila alpestris (A)
 Calandra lark, Melanocorypha calandra (A)
 Wood lark, Lullula arborea (A)
 Eurasian skylark (lerkur), Alauda arvensis

Reed warblers and allies
Order: PasseriformesFamily: Acrocephalidae

The members of this family are usually rather large for "warblers". Most are rather plain olivaceous brown above with much yellow to beige below. They are usually found in open woodland, reedbeds, or tall grass. The family occurs mostly in southern to western Eurasia and surroundings, but it also ranges far into the Pacific, with some species in Africa.

 Booted warbler, Iduna caligata (A)
 Sykes's warbler, Iduna rama (A)
 Melodious warbler, Hippolais polyglotta (A)
 Icterine warbler, Hippolais icterina (A)
 Sedge warbler, Acrocephalus schoenobaenus (A)
 Paddyfield warbler, Acrocephalus agricola (A)
 Blyth's reed warbler, Acrocephalus dumetorum (A)
 Marsh warbler, Acrocephalus palustris (A)
 Eurasian reed warbler, Acrocephalus scirpaceus (A)
 Great reed warbler, Acrocephalus arundinaceus (A)

Grassbirds and allies 
Order: PasseriformesFamily: Locustellidae

Locustellidae are a family of small insectivorous songbirds found mainly in Eurasia, Africa, and the Australian region. They are smallish birds with tails that are usually long and pointed, and tend to be drab brownish or buffy all over.

 Pallas's grasshopper warbler, Helopsaltes certhiola (A)
 Lanceolated warbler, Locustella lanceolata (A)
 Common grasshopper-warbler, Locustella naevia (A)

Swallows
Order: PasseriformesFamily: Hirundinidae

The family Hirundinidae is adapted to aerial feeding. They have a slender streamlined body, long pointed wings, and a short bill with a wide gape. The feet are adapted to perching rather than walking, and the front toes are partially joined at the base.

 Bank swallow, Riparia riparia (A)
 Barn swallow (svala), Hirundo rustica
 Red-rumped swallow, Cecropis daurica (A)
 Common house-martin (lonsvala), Delichon urbicum

Leaf warblers
Order: PasseriformesFamily: Phylloscopidae

Leaf warblers are a family of small insectivorous birds found mostly in Eurasia and ranging into Wallacea and Africa. The species are of various sizes, often green-plumaged above and yellow below, or more subdued with grayish-green to grayish-brown colors.

 Wood warbler, Phylloscopus sibilatrix (A)
 Western Bonelli's warbler, Phylloscopus bonelli (A)
 Eastern Bonelli's warbler, Phylloscopus orientalis (A)
 Yellow-browed warbler, Phylloscopus inornatus (A)
 Hume's warbler, Phylloscopus humei (A)
 Pallas's leaf warbler, Phylloscopus proregulus (A)
 Radde's warbler, Phylloscopus schwarzi (A)
 Dusky warbler, Phylloscopus fuscatus (A)
 Willow warbler, Phylloscopus trochilus (A)
 Common chiffchaff, Phylloscopus collybita
 Green warbler, Phylloscopus nitidus (A)
 Greenish warbler, Phylloscopus trochiloides (A)
 Arctic warbler, Phylloscopus borealis (A)

Sylviid warblers, parrotbills, and allies
Order: PasseriformesFamily: Sylviidae

The family Sylviidae is a group of small insectivorous birds. They mainly occur as breeding species, as another common name (Old World warblers) implies, in Europe, Asia and, to a lesser extent, Africa. Most are of generally undistinguished appearance, but many have distinctive songs.

 Eurasian blackcap, Sylvia atricapilla
 Garden warbler (garðljómari), Sylvia borin
 Barred warbler, Curruca nisoria
 Lesser whitethroat (notuljómari), Curruca curruca
 Rüppell's warbler, Curruca ruppeli (A)
 Eastern subalpine warbler, Curruca cantillans (A)
 Greater whitethroat, Curruca communis

Kinglets
Order: PasseriformesFamily: Regulidae

The kinglets and "crests" are a small family of birds which resemble some warblers. They are very small insectivorous birds in the single genus Regulus. The adults have colored crowns, giving rise to their name.

 Goldcrest, Regulus regulus
 Common firecrest, Regulus ignicapilla (A)

Treecreepers
Order: PasseriformesFamily: Certhiidae

Treecreepers are small woodland birds, brown above and white below. They have thin pointed down-curved bills, which they use to extricate insects from bark. They have stiff tail feathers, like woodpeckers, which they use to support themselves on vertical trees.

 Eurasian treecreeper, Certhia familiaris (A)

Wrens
Order: PasseriformesFamily: Troglodytidae

The wrens are mainly small and inconspicuous except for their loud songs. These birds have short wings and thin down-turned bills. Several species often hold their tails upright. All are insectivorous.

 Eurasian wren (músabróðir), Troglodytes troglodytes

Dippers
Order: PasseriformesFamily: Cinclidae

Dippers are a group of perching birds whose habitat includes aquatic environments in the Americas, Europe, and Asia. They are named for their bobbing or dipping movements.

 White-throated dipper, Cinclus cinclus (A)

Starlings
Order: PasseriformesFamily: Sturnidae

Starlings are small to medium-sized passerine birds. Their flight is strong and direct and they are very gregarious. Their preferred habitat is fairly open country. They eat insects and fruit. Their plumage is typically dark with a metallic sheen.

 European starling (stari), Sturnus vulgaris
 Rosy starling, Pastor roseus (A)

Thrushes and allies
Order: PasseriformesFamily: Turdidae

The thrushes are a family of birds that occur mainly in the Old World. They are plump, soft-plumaged, small-to-medium-sized insectivores or sometimes omnivores, often feeding on the ground. Many have attractive songs.

 White's thrush, Zoothera aurea (A)
 Scaly thrush, Zoothera dauma (A)
 Mistle thrush, Turdus viscivorus (A)
 Song thrush, Turdus philomelos
 Redwing (oðinshani), Turdus iliacus
 Eurasian blackbird (kvørkveggja), Turdus merula
 Fieldfare, Turdus pilaris
 Ring ouzel, Turdus torquatus (A)
 Dusky thrush, Turdus eunomus (A)
 Naumann's thrush, Turdus naumanni (A)

Old World flycatchers
Order: PasseriformesFamily: Muscicapidae

Old World flycatchers are a large group of birds which are mainly small arboreal insectivores. The appearance of these birds is highly varied, but they mostly have weak songs and harsh calls.

 Asian brown flycatcher, Muscicapa dauurica (A)
 Spotted flycatcher, Muscicapa striata (A)
 European robin, Erithacus rubecula
 Thrush nightingale, Luscinia luscinia (A)
 Common nightingale, Luscinia megarhynchos (A)
 Bluethroat, Luscinia svecica (A)
 Siberian rubythroat, Calliope calliope (A)
 Red-flanked bluetail, Tarsiger cyanurus (A)
 Red-breasted flycatcher, Ficedula parva (A)
 European pied flycatcher, Ficedula hypoleuca
 Collared flycatcher, Ficedula albicollis (A)
 Common redstart, Phoenicurus phoenicurus
 Black redstart, Phoenicurus ochruros (A)
 Whinchat, Saxicola rubetra (A)
 European stonechat, Saxicola rubicola (A)
 Siberian stonechat, Saxicola maurus (A)
 Northern wheatear (steinstólpa), Oenanthe oenanthe

Waxwings
Order: PasseriformesFamily: Bombycillidae

The waxwings are a group of birds with soft silky plumage and unique red tips to some of the wing feathers. In the Bohemian and cedar waxwings, these tips look like sealing wax and give the group its name. These are arboreal birds of northern forests. They live on insects in summer and berries in winter.

 Bohemian waxwing, Bombycilla garrulus

Accentors
Order: PasseriformesFamily: Prunellidae

The accentors are the only bird family which is endemic to the Palearctic. They are small, fairly drab species superficially similar to sparrows.

 Dunnock, Prunella modularis (A)

Old World sparrows
Order: PasseriformesFamily: Passeridae

In general, Old World sparrows tend to be small, plump, brown or gray birds with short tails and short powerful beaks. Sparrows are seed eaters, but they also consume small insects.

 House sparrow (gráspurvur), Passer domesticus
 Eurasian tree sparrow (gerðisspurvur), Passer montanus

Wagtails and pipits
Order: PasseriformesFamily: Motacillidae

Motacillidae is a family of small birds with medium to long tails which includes the wagtails, longclaws, and pipits. They are slender ground-feeding insectivores of open country.

 Gray wagtail, Motacilla cinerea (A)
 Western yellow wagtail, Motacilla flava
 Eastern yellow wagtail, Motacilla tschutschensis (A)
 Citrine wagtail, Motacilla citreola (A)
 White wagtail (erla kongsdóttir), Motacilla alba
 Richard's pipit, Anthus richardi (A)
 Meadow pipit (titlingur), Anthus pratensis
 Tree pipit, Anthus trivialis (A)
 Olive-backed pipit, Anthus hodgsoni (A)
 Pechora pipit, Anthus gustavi (A)
 Red-throated pipit, Anthus cervinus (A)
 Rock pipit (grátitlingur), Anthus petrosus
 American pipit, Anthus rubescens (A)

Finches, euphonias, and allies

Order: PasseriformesFamily: Fringillidae

Finches are seed-eating birds that are small to moderately large and have a strong beak, usually conical and in some species very large. All have twelve tail feathers and nine primaries. These birds have a bouncing flight with alternating bouts of flapping and gliding on closed wings, and most sing well.

 Common chaffinch, Fringilla coelebs
 Brambling (fjallafinka), Fringilla montifringilla
 Hawfinch, Coccothraustes coccothraustes (A)
 Common rosefinch, Carpodacus erythrinus (A)
 Eurasian bullfinch, Pyrrhula pyrrhula (A)
 European greenfinch, Chloris chloris
 Twite (íriskur), Linaria flavirostris (A)
 Eurasian linnet, Linaria cannabina (A)
 Common redpoll, Acanthis flammea
 Lesser redpoll, Acanthis cabaret (A)
 Hoary redpoll, Acanthis hornemanni (A)
 Parrot crossbill, Loxia pytyopsittacus (A)
 Red crossbill, Loxia curvirostra
 White-winged crossbill, Loxia leucoptera (A)
 European goldfinch, Carduelis carduelis (A)
 Eurasian siskin, Spinus spinus (A)

Longspurs and snow buntings
Order: PasseriformesFamily: Calcariidae

The Calcariidae are a family of birds that had been traditionally grouped with the New World sparrows, but differ in a number of respects and are usually found in open grassy areas.

 Lapland bunting, Calcarius lapponicus (A)
 Snow bunting (snjófulgur), Plectrophenax nivalis

Old World buntings
Order: PasseriformesFamily: Emberizidae

Emberizidae is a family of passerine birds containing a single genus. Until 2017, the New World sparrows (Passerellidae) were also considered part of this family.

 Black-headed bunting, Emberiza melanocephala (A)
 Red-headed bunting, Emberiza bruniceps (A)
 Corn bunting, Emberiza calandra (A)
 Yellowhammer, Emberiza citrinella (A)
 Ortolan, Emberiza hortulana (A)
 Reed bunting, Emberiza schoeniclus (A)
 Little bunting, Emberiza pusilla (A)
 Rustic bunting, Emberiza rustica (A)

New World sparrows
Order: PasseriformesFamily: Passerellidae

Until 2017, these species were considered part of the family Emberizidae. Most of the species are known as sparrows, but these birds are not closely related to the Old World sparrows which are in the family Passeridae. Many of these have distinctive head patterns.

 White-crowned sparrow, Zonotrichia leucophrys (A)

New World warblers
Order: PasseriformesFamily: Parulidae

Parulidae are a group of small, often colorful birds restricted to the New World. Most are arboreal and insectivorous. 

 Black-and-white warbler, Mniotilta varia (A)
 Tennessee warbler, Leiothlypis peregrina (A)
 Northern parula, Setophaga americana (A)
 Yellow warbler, Setophaga petechia (A)

Cardinals and allies
Order: PasseriformesFamily: Cardinalidae

The cardinals are a family of robust seed-eating birds with strong bills. They are typically associated with open woodland. The sexes usually have distinct plumages.

 Lazuli bunting, Passerina amoena (A)

Places

Excellent places for watching seabirds (guillemots, kittiwakes and puffins are common everywhere) including:
Svínoy with many great skuas
The Vestmanna cliffs with a boat tour
Mykines has the only Faroese population of gannets
Nólsoy has the largest colony of storm petrels in the world
Skúvoy with the largest Faroese colony of guillemots and many great skuas, which gave the island its name
Suðuroy has at the west coast the best accessible bird cliffs from the land side

See also
List of birds
Lists of birds by region
 Faroese puffin

References

 
 
 Williamson, Kenneth. (1970). The Atlantic Islands. Collins: London. (2nd edition).

External links

About the stamps and the birds
PDF download of Faroese birds (652.31 KB, 4 pages)
Faroenature.net - Bird Names (Latin, Faroese, English, Danish, German, Norwegian, Swedish)

Faroe Islands
Birds
Faroe Islands
'Faroe Islands

de:Färöer#Tierwelt